The 2001 Montana State Bobcats football team was an American football team that represented Montana State University in the Big Sky Conference during the 2001 NCAA Division I-AA football season. In their second season under head coach Mike Kramer, the Bobcats compiled a 5–6 record (4–3 against Big Sky opponents) and finished in fourth place out of eight teams in the Big Sky. The Bobcats dropped their 16th consecutive game in the Montana–Montana State football rivalry.

Schedule

References

Montana State
Montana State Bobcats football seasons
Montana State Bobcats football